Ceren Demirçelen (born February 23, 1992) is a Turkish women's handballer, who plays in the Turkish Women's Handball Super League for Kastamonu Bld. GSK, and the Turkey national team. The -tall sportswoman is line player.

Playing career

Club
Ceren Demirçelen began her sports career in the 2010–11 season joining the handball team of Kastamonu University, which played in the Turkish Women's Handball First League. In the 2012–13 and 2013–14 seasons, she played in the Women's Sıper League for Araç Belediyespor, which was renamed to Kastamonu Bld. GSK in July 2014. She continued to remain on the squad of Kastamonu Bld. GSK in the coming seasons.

She participated at the 2015–16 Women's EHF Challenge Cup with Kastamonu Bld. GSK.

International

In November 2014, Demirçelen was admitted the Turkey women's national handball team. She ttok part at the qualification matches of the 2015 World Women's Handball Championship – European qualification.

Honours
 Turkish Women's Handball Super League
 Third place (1): 2014–15.

References 

1992 births
People from Amasya
Turkish female handball players
Kastamonu Bld. SK (women's handball) players
Kastamonu University alumni
Turkey women's national handball players
Living people
Mediterranean Games competitors for Turkey
Competitors at the 2022 Mediterranean Games
21st-century Turkish sportswomen